Mossy may refer to:

Places
Mossy, West Virginia, unincorporated community in Fayette County, West Virginia, United States

Given names
Mossy Cade (born 1961), former professional American football player
Mossy Lawler (born 1980), rugby union player
Mossy Murphy, retired Irish sportsperson
Tomás Quinn, retired Irish sportsperson
Mossy O'Riordan, Irish sportsperson who played hurling with the Cork senior inter-county team in the 1940s and 1950s
Mossy, a fictional character in The Golden Key by George MacDonald

See also
Battle of Mossy Creek, minor battle of the American Civil War, on December 29, 1863
Mossy fiber (cerebellum), one of the major inputs to cerebellum
Mossy fiber (hippocampus), pathway to the CA3 region
Mossy forest shrew (Crocidura musseri), a species of shrew native to Indonesia
Mossy-nest swiftlet (Aerodramus salangana), a species of swift in the family Apodidae
Mossie (disambiguation)
Mossi (disambiguation)